Seydikemer is a planned district and second level municipality in Muğla Province, Turkey. According to the 2012 Metropolitan Municipalities Law (law no. 6360), all Turkish provinces with a population of more than 750,000 will become metropolitan municipalities and the districts within the metropolitan municipalities will be second-level municipalities. The law also creates new districts within the provinces in addition to present districts. These changes were effective by the local elections in 2014.

Thus after 2014, a part of the present township of Kemer in Fethiye district was declared as the district of Seydikemer. The prefix Seydi refers to Seydiler, presently a village next to Kemer.

There are nevertheless a few expats living here. As with most towns that have expats in the area, a certain cafe/bar serves as a local meeting place.

Villages
There are 65 villages in Seydikemer. Popular places are Saklikent National Park, Tlos, Letoon, Pinara, Sidyma, Erendag and Oenoanda.

References

Districts of Muğla Province
Fethiye District